Tommy O'Haver (born October 24, 1968, Indianapolis, Indiana) is an American film director and screenwriter.

He grew up in Carmel, Indiana, a suburb of Indianapolis. He graduated from Carmel High School and matriculated at Indiana University with a joint degree in Journalism and Comparative Literature. In the mid-1990s, he attended the MFA Film program at the University of Southern California School of Cinematic Arts. While there, he directed shorts that appeared at major festivals, including Sundance and The New York Film Festival.

Billy's Hollywood Screen Kiss, featuring Sean Hayes, was O'Haver's directorial debut. Billy's Hollywood Screen Kiss played in competition at the 1998 Sundance Film Festival and screened at the Helsinki International Film Festival. His follow-up film Get Over It featured Kirsten Dunst, Ben Foster, Mila Kunis and Zoe Saldana in a teen comedy about a school theater production. O'Haver's third film, Ella Enchanted, starred Anne Hathaway. Catherine Keener, Elliot Page and James Franco star in An American Crime, which premiered at Sundance in 2007, a film based on a true story of Gertrude Baniszewski, an Indiana woman charged in 1965 with the murder of Sylvia Likens. The initial reaction at Sundance was mixed, but the film garnered critical praise. O'Haver and his writing partner, Irene Turner, were nominated for a Writer's Guild Award for the film as well.

In June 2013, he directed the music video "Rollin'" for MiBBs. On April 2, 2015, the seventh episode of The Late Late Show with James Corden was broadcast from O'Haver's house.

In 2017, O'Haver's fifth film, The Most Hated Woman in America, was released; it starred  Melissa Leo as Madalyn Murray O'Hair, the founder of American Atheists.

Filmography

References

External links
 

1968 births
Living people
American male screenwriters
Carmel High School (Indiana) alumni
People from Carmel, Indiana
USC School of Cinematic Arts alumni
Date of birth missing (living people)
Film directors from Indiana
Screenwriters from Indiana
LGBT film directors